In functional analysis the Meyers–Serrin theorem, named after James Serrin and Norman George Meyers, states that smooth functions are dense in the Sobolev space 
for arbitrary domains .

Historical relevance

The theorem establishes the equivalence  of both definitions. It is quite surprising that, in contradistinction to many other density theorems, this result does not require any smoothness of the domain . According to the standard reference on Sobolev spaces by Adams and Fournier (p 60): "This result, published in 1964 by Meyers and Serrin ended much confusion about the relationship of these spaces that existed in the literature before that time. It is surprising that this elementary result remained undiscovered for so long."

References
.
.

Sobolev spaces
Theorems in functional analysis